The Best of Me is a greatest hits album by English singer-songwriter Rick Astley. It was released on 25 October 2019 by BMG. The album includes the single "Every One of Us", which was released in September 2019.

The album has two discs, a disc of old recordings, and a second disc that consists of new recordings of "reimagined" old songs with new interpretation. It includes a stripped-back, slowed-down version of "Never Gonna Give You Up" accompanied by pianoforte.  It also includes a new song, "Every One of Us", which was released on 12 September 2019 as the first single from the album with a post on Twitter from Astley, who also confirmed the title of the album and its release date.

The Best of Me reached number 4 on the UK Albums Chart and number 1 on the UK Independent Albums chart.

Track listing
Disc 1

Disc 2 – Reimagined Classics

Charts

Certifications

References

External links
 Official website

2019 compilation albums
Rick Astley albums